"Where The City Meets The Sea" is the lead single from the Australian rock band The Getaway Plan's debut album Other Voices, Other Rooms. It reached #28 on the ARIA chart.

Track listing
CD single
 Where The City Meets The Sea - 3:36
 The Flood - 3:49
 Where The City Meets The Sea (Nova 100 acoustic recording) - 3:46

iTunes EP
 Where The City Meets The Sea - 3:36
 The Flood - 3:49
 Where The City Meets The Sea (Nova 100 acoustic recording) - 3:46
 Streetlight (Live on Triple J)

Charts
The song debuted and peaked at #28, before falling to #39, then exiting top 50. Two weeks later it made two more appearances in the top 50 before exiting again.

Weekly charts

End of year charts

Release history

References

2008 singles
2008 songs